Hooters Road Trip, released as Free Wheelin' USA on PC, is a racing video game for PC and PlayStation platforms released in 2002.

Development
It was produced by Hoplite Research, a company founded by former playtester Manny Granillo. It is built around the license of the Hooters restaurant chain, featuring both real life and computer-generated images and video footage of its iconic "Hooters Girl" waitresses.

Development
Art assets found in the game's files suggest the PlayStation release was originally also to be titled Free Wheelin' USA with the Hooters license later added on.

Reception

Hooters Road Trip received "unfavorable" reviews on both platforms according to video game review aggregator Metacritic. Game Informer rated this game as one of the worst games ever made, and it was one of the last games released for the original Sony PlayStation. In 2017, Gamesradar ranked the game 49th in their "The 50 Worst Games of All Time."

References

External links
 

2002 video games
Hooters
North America-exclusive video games
PlayStation (console) games
Racing video games
Video games about food and drink
Video games developed in the United States
Windows games
Advergames
Ubisoft games